A guivre is a mythical creature similar to a dragon. In legend they were portrayed as serpentine creatures who possessed venomous breath and prowled the countryside of Medieval France. The words "guivre" (wurm, wyvern [which is derived from it], or serpent) and "givre" are spelling variations of the more common word "vouivre".  Vouivre, in Franc-Comtois, is the equivalent of the old French word "guivre." All these forms are derived ultimately from Latin vīpera, as is English viper.

Description and habits
Guivres were said to possess a long, serpentine body and a dragon's head. The hind feet are not as visible if present at all. The guivre had horns in its forehead in some accounts, as well. Locally in France it was known as an extremely aggressive creature that would sometimes attack without being provoked. They were afraid of naked humans, and when saw them, blushed and looked away. Documentation points to their residence as being in small bodies of water like pools and lakes, forests, and any damp place. also found in Europe.

La Guivre 
Samson of Dol was present at an encounter between a small dragon-like creature (known as "La Guivre") and a priest. Samson had come to visit Saint Suliao with an entourage of followers. Suliao was impoverished but sought to provide a meal as best as possible for the group. One priest, uneasy with the low quality of food, took a bread roll and hid it under his robe. Almost instantaneously he started convulsing and Suliao pulled apart his bosom, seeing what the man had done. He admonished the priest and removed a hideous serpentine creature from the robe. There he exorcised it and then compelled another man to throw it from the roof of a building in Garot.

Vouivre 
Guivres are also well known as vouivres, and the terms have become synonymous. For example, in The Drac: French Tales of Dragons and Demons, the vouivre is depicted as a female creature with dazzling, green scales which emanate sound as the vouivre flies. The vouivre is depicted as greedy, her head crowned with pearls and a golden ring about her tail. The beast in this story stayed in a cave for most of her time, then left to bathe only for a few minutes.

According to the Contes et légendes de Franche-Comté, the Vouivre is a unique gigantic snake like dragon, wearing a ruby on its forehead, and using it as its eye.

Literary use 
In Steve Alten's The Loch the Loch Ness Monster is originally thought to be a guivre which got into Loch Ness through Moray Firth. The guiuvres were said to be a species of giant eel, a predecessor to the Anguilla. In the 1989 film La Vouivre, the vouivre was a wood nymph.

See also 
Biscione

References

Bibliography 
 
 
 

French legendary creatures
Legendary serpents
European dragons
Mythological monsters